Sepsina copei, also known commonly as Cope's reduced-limb skink or the sepsina skink, is a species of lizard in the family Scincidae. The species is endemic to Angola.

Etymology
The specific name, copei, is in honor of American herpetologist and paleontologist Edward Drinker Cope.

Habitat

Description
The eye is small, and the lower eyelid is transparent. It has very short legs, with three toes on each foot. Dorsally, it is pale brown. Ventrally, it is whitish.

Behavior
S. copei is terrestrial and fossorial.

Reproduction
S. copei is viviparous.

References

Further reading
"Barboza [sic] du Bocage, J. V." (1873). "Mélanges erpétologiques. II. Sur quelques Reptiles et Batraciens nouveaux, rares ou peu connus d'Afrique occidentale". Jornal de Sciencias Mathematicas Physicas e Naturaes da Academia Real das Sciencias de Lisboa 4 (15): 209–227. (Sepsina copei, new species, pp. 212–213). (in French).
Marques MP, Ceríaco LMP, Blackburn DC, Bauer AM (2018). "Diversity and Distribution of the Amphibians and Terrestrial Reptiles of Angola — Atlas of Historical and Bibliographic Records (1840–2017)". Proceedings of the California Academy of Sciences, Fourth Series 65: 1–501. (Supplement II). (Sepsina copei, p. 252).

copei
Reptiles described in 1873
Taxa named by José Vicente Barbosa du Bocage